Boomhower Hill is a mountain located in the Catskill Mountains of New York northeast of Delhi. Federal Hill is located southwest and Bramley Mountain is located east of Boomhower Hill.

References

Mountains of Delaware County, New York
Mountains of New York (state)